Dominion 6.22 was a professional wrestling pay-per-view (PPV) event promoted by New Japan Pro-Wrestling (NJPW). The event took place on June 22, 2013, in Osaka, Osaka, at the Bodymaker Colosseum. The event featured ten matches (including one dark match), four of which were contested for championships. It was the fifth event under the Dominion name.

Storylines
Dominion 6.22 featured ten professional wrestling matches that involved different wrestlers from pre-existing scripted feuds and storylines. Wrestlers portrayed villains, heroes, or less distinguishable characters in the scripted events that built tension and culminated in a wrestling match or series of matches.

Event
The event featured a special three-way tag team match, where IWGP Tag Team Champions Tencozy (Hiroyoshi Tenzan and Satoshi Kojima) faced GHC Tag Team Champions Takashi Iizuka and Toru Yano and NWA World Tag Team Champions K.E.S. (Davey Boy Smith Jr. and Lance Archer), though only the IWGP title was on the line. As part of the newly revived relationship between NJPW and the National Wrestling Alliance (NWA), the event featured the second time Rob Conway defended the NWA World Heavyweight Championship in a NJPW ring. During the event, Tetsuya Naito wrestled his first match since King of Pro-Wrestling in October 2012, defeating former No Limit partner Yujiro Takahashi, who in storyline had caused his knee injury. In the semi-main event, Prince Devitt defeated rival Hiroshi Tanahashi to earn his first shot at the IWGP Heavyweight Championship, held by Kazuchika Okada, who retained the title against Togi Makabe in the main event. Following his win, Okada accepted Devitt's challenge on the condition that he first defend his IWGP Junior Heavyweight Championship against Okada's manager Gedo.

Results

References

External links
The official New Japan Pro-Wrestling website

2013
2013 in professional wrestling
June 2013 events in Japan
Professional wrestling in Osaka
Events in Osaka